Wallis and Futuna competed at the 2019 Pacific Games in Apia, Samoa from 7 to 20 July 2019. The country participated in five sports at the 2019 games.

Athletics

 

Wallis and Futuna selected a team of 13 male athletes (and 3 coaches) to compete in athletics at the 2019 games:

Men
 Falemanu Aveuki: Para sport Javelin
 Victor Dabrion: Track
 Tony Falelavaki: Para sport Javelin
 Regis Kirsch: Track
 Sililo Kivalu: Decathlon
 Ma'alamalu Lakalaka: Decathlon
 Jean Mafoa Jr: Throwing events
 Stephen Louis Mailagi: Throwing events
 Boris Mauligalo: Track
 Soane Hea Munikiha'afata: Track
 Magoni Tauvale: Pole vault
 Felise Vahai Sosaia: Throwing events
 Selevasio Vala'o: Throwing events

Outrigger canoeing

Wallis and Futuna selected 14 men and 12 women to compete in the Va'a events at the 2019 games.

Men
 Stéphane Goepfert
 Sosefo Ikauno
 Pierre  Lakalaka
 Dickson Siakinuu
 Georges Simete
 Jean  Sione
 Keleto Tauhola
 Paulo Tauhola
 Sesilio Toafatavao
 Jacky Tuakoifenua
 Sanualio Tuifua
 Petelo Tulitau
 Jean  Tu'ulaki
 Sosefo Valefaka'aga
 
Women
 Lindsay Fiafialoto
 Veliteki Fiafialoto
 Asela Kolivai
 Ema Kulimoetoke
 Ingrid Malau
 Nefa Masei
 Fatima Muni
 Tupou Muni
 Alida  Pressen
 Suliana Tulitau
 Lupe Ulutuipalelei
 Lifukava Ulutuipalelei

Rugby sevens

Men's sevens

Women's sevens

Volleyball

Wallis and Futuna selected 14 players in each of their men's and women's volleyball squads for the 2019 games.

Men's team
 Florian Asi
 Maleko Falematagia
 Petelo Kolokilagi
 Kani Laufoaulu
 Paino Moleana
 Akelausi Nau
 Josias Paino
 Esekiele Sekeme
 Boris Takaniko
 Talite'ofa Tiniloa
 Glenn Teuila Tuifua
 Vitali Tupou
 Sioli Tu'ufui
 Patrick Vanai

Women's team
 Martinaya Dornic
 Emelita Lauhea
 Gladys Pressense
 Alida Pressense
 Eusenia Sekeme
 Soana Sekeme
 Lita Tafilagi
 Tauhala Tafilagi
 Malia Tameha
 Gloria Taofifenua
 Finetoga Taofifenua
 Esperenza Tuafuna
 Siokivaka Tukumuli
 Emanuela Tupou

Weightlifting

References

Nations at the 2019 Pacific Games
2019